St. Mary's Springs Academy (SMSA, formerly St. Mary's Springs High School) is a Catholic, private, coeducational system serving grades 3-year-old Preschool through High School in Fond du Lac, Wisconsin and is associated with the Archdiocese of Milwaukee. It was founded by the Sisters of Saint Agnes in 1909.

History

The Sisters of Saint Agnes came to the site of the school in 1901 to open a sanitarium after money was donated by local businessman Henry Boyle. The first building built on the site in 1901, Boyle Hall, was named in his honor. This building and St. Agnes Hall, located immediately to the north of Boyle Hall, were used as a sanitarium until 1909 when the site was changed into a boarding school for girls. The school held its first graduation in 1911. Though run by the Sisters of St. Agnes, it became affiliated with The Catholic University of America in 1915 and then became known as St. Mary's Springs Academy. In 1928, a large school building was constructed to the north of Boyle Hall. In 1939, St. Mary's Springs Academy revised its mission and opened its doors to young men as well as young women. In 1956, boarding facilities were discontinued.

With increasing enrollment during the 1950s and 1960s, a need arose for another building. Telethons were held to raise money for the construction.  In 1970, the school's name was changed to St. Mary's Springs High School after becoming jointly sponsored by the Archdiocese of Milwaukee and the Congregation of the Sisters of St. Agnes. A new academic building was built that year at the north end of the campus, immediately north of the main building. Both buildings held classes until the main building became known as the Administration Building due to dwindling class sizes. It continued to house the offices, cafeteria, and an auditorium. Around 2001, the Administration Building was permanently closed due to asbestos being found in the building. In 2005, Boyle Hall, which had sat vacant for nearly 25 years, was torn down due to structural problems. The old administration building sat vacant until it was razed in 2015 to make way for a proposed preK-12 academic complex.

In 2008, St. Mary's Springs High School was merged with FACES (Fond du Lac Area Catholic Education System) to form a K-12 system. FACES consisted of two campuses, St. Joseph's Primary School and St. Mary's Middle School.  The three campuses began operating under the name of St. Mary's Springs Academy. Plans were underway to build a complex combining the Academy due to the aging buildings of the former FACES campus. A campaign, called the Second Century Campaign, was launched to fund building this new complex at the high school location.

At the start of the 2016–2017 academic year, the new St. Mary's Springs Academy complex opened its doors to students in pre-Kindergarten through grade 12. The complex consisted of the academic building (built in 1970) connected to the large new addition. The older portion of the building was completely renovated to make better use of space as well as to update classrooms for modern learning. Currently, grades 6–12 occupy the older portion while pre-Kindergarten through grade 5, as well as administrative offices, occupy the new portion of the building.

The school completed construction of a new turf field in 2021.

Trivia

St. Mary's Springs was given its name due to the presence of artesian springs which flow naturally from "the Ledge," or the Niagara Escarpment, a glacial land formation in which the campus is built into. It was thought that the fresh air and natural spring water held healing benefits for tuberculosis patients of the sanitarium which originally occupied the site.

Shortly before Boyle Hall was razed, a ceremony was held at the school at which the cornerstone was opened to reveal mementos from the past.

The landmark bell tower of the old administration building, which could be viewed from across town, was reconstructed on the site of the new school complex. After plans for the new complex were underway, a separate campaign, called Bring It Back Home, was launched to fund the reconstruction. A bell tower with a similar appearance to the original now sits on The Ledge.

Athletics

Championships

State championships
 Boys' basketball: 1993, 1994
 Boys' cross country: 1971
 Girls' cross country: 1992, 1993, 1995, 1996, 1997
 Football: 1983, 1984, 1990, 1991, 1995, 1997, 1998, 1999, 2002, 2009, 2011, 2012, 2014, 2015, 2017, 2018, 2019
 Boys' golf: 1959, 2015, 2016, 2017, 2018
 Boys' hockey: 1981, 1982, 1985, 1986, 1987, 2020, 2021.
 Boys' track: 1975, 1979, 1993, 1996, 1997, 1998, 2000, 2012.
 Baseball: 2016.

Conference championships
 Boys' cross country: 1971, 1972, 1996, 2000
 Girls' cross country: 1992, 1993, 1994, 1995, 1996, 1997, 1999, 2000, 2001, 2009, 2010
 Football: 1975, 1976, 1977, 1978, 1981, 1983, 1985, 1986, 1987, 1988, 1989, 1990, 1991, 1992, 1993, 1994, 1995, 1996, 1998, 1999, 2000, 2002, 2004, 2008, 2009, 2011, 2012, 2013, 2014, 2015, 2016, 2017, 2018, 2019, 2020
 Girls' tennis: 1992
 Volleyball: 1976, 2018, 2021
 Boys' basketball: 1993, 2003, 2021
 Girls' basketball: 2001, 2002
 Boys' hockey: 2011, 2020, 2021
 Girls' hockey: 2011
 Baseball: 1983, 1984, 1985, 1987, 1993, 1994, 1995, 2000, 2001, 2004, 2008, 2009
 Golf: 1961, 1971, 1972, 1986, 1992, 1994, 1996, 1998, 2000, 2004, 2005, 2006, 2007, 2008, 2009, 2010, 2011, 2012
 Girls' soccer: 2007, 2008
 Softball: 1992
 Boys' track: 1975, 1987, 1988, 1998, 1999, 2000
 Girls' track: 1997, 1998, 1999, 2000, 2011

Notable people
 Wisconsin State Senator Warren Braun is a graduate.
 Wisconsin State Representative John P. Dobyns is a graduate.
 Rabies survivor Jeanna Giese graduated in 2007.

References

External links
St. Mary's Springs Academy
Sisters of St. Agnes

Roman Catholic Archdiocese of Milwaukee
Educational institutions established in 1909
Fond du Lac, Wisconsin
Catholic secondary schools in Wisconsin
Schools in Fond du Lac County, Wisconsin
1909 establishments in Wisconsin